East Boldon is a Tyne and Wear Metro station, serving the villages of Cleadon and East Boldon, South Tyneside in Tyne and Wear, England. It joined the network on 31 March 2002, following the opening of the extension from Pelaw to South Hylton.

History
The station originally opened on 19 June 1839 as Cleadon Lane, under the Brandling Junction Railway. It was later renamed East Boldon on 1 October 1898.

Services were operated by steam trains until November 1955, when diesel multiple units took over most services between Newcastle and Middlesbrough, which continued until the Tyne and Wear Metro commenced electric train service in 2002. Although passenger service is operated by Tyne and Wear Metro, the track is owned and maintained by Network Rail with other operators using the route, including LNER, Northern, GB Railfreight and DRS Railfreight.

As well as Seaburn, Brockley Whins and Heworth, East Boldon was formerly served by rail services operating along the Durham Coast Line between Sunderland and Newcastle. Following the introduction of Tyne and Wear Metro services to Wearside in March 2002, Heworth is now the only remaining intermediate station served by rail services operating between Sunderland and Newcastle.

Along with other stations on the line between Fellgate and South Hylton, the station is fitted with vitreous enamel panels designed by artist, Morag Morrison. Each station uses a different arrangement of colours, with strong colours used in platform shelters and ticketing areas, and a more neutral palate for external elements.

The station was used by 319,224 passengers in 2017–18, making it the sixth-most-used station on the Wearside extension.

Facilities 
Step-free access is available at all stations across the Tyne and Wear Metro network, with ramped access to platforms at East Boldon. The station is also equipped with ticket machines, waiting shelter, seating, next train information displays, timetable posters, and an emergency help point on both platforms. Ticket machines are able to accept payment with credit and debit card (including contactless payment), notes and coins. The station is also fitted with smartcard validators, which feature at all stations across the network.

There is a free car park available, with 58 parking spaces, plus four accessible spaces, as well as a taxi rank. There is also the provision for cycle parking, with nine cycle lockers and five cycle pods available for use.

Services 
, the station is served by up to five trains per hour on weekdays and Saturday, and up to four trains per hour during the evening and on Sunday.

Rolling stock used: Class 599 Metrocar

References

Sources

External links
 
  Timetable and station information for East Boldon

Former North Eastern Railway (UK) stations
Railway stations in Great Britain opened in 1839
Tyne and Wear Metro Green line stations
1839 establishments in England
Transport in Tyne and Wear
Buildings and structures in the Metropolitan Borough of South Tyneside